The cryptic dwarf gecko (Lygodactylus incognitus) is a species of gecko native to South Africa.

References

Lygodactylus
Reptiles described in 1992
Taxa named by Neils Henning Gunther Jacobsen